In enzymology, a tyrosine-ester sulfotransferase is an enzyme that catalyzes the chemical reaction

3'-phosphoadenylyl sulfate + L-tyrosine methyl ester  adenosine 3',5'-bisphosphate + L-tyrosine methyl ester 4-sulfate

Thus, the two substrates of this enzyme are 3'-phosphoadenylyl sulfate and L-tyrosine methyl ester, whereas its two products are adenosine 3',5'-bisphosphate and L-tyrosine methyl ester 4-sulfate.

This enzyme belongs to the family of transferases, specifically the sulfotransferases, which transfer sulfur-containing groups.  The systematic name of this enzyme class is 3'-phosphoadenylyl-sulfate:L-tyrosine-methyl-ester sulfotransferase. Other names in common use include aryl sulfotransferase IV, and L-tyrosine methyl ester sulfotransferase.

References

 
 
 

EC 2.8.2
Enzymes of unknown structure